Antonio James Manchin (April 7, 1927 – November 3, 2003) was a West Virginia Democratic politician who served as a member of the House of Delegates (1948–50; 1998-2003), as Secretary of State (1977–85), and as State Treasurer (1985–89). A colorful and controversial figure, he was the uncle of former West Virginia Governor and current U.S. Senator Joe Manchin III.

Early life
Manchin was born in Farmington, West Virginia to Kathleen and Joseph Manchin I. His parents were of Italian descent. He was educated in the schools of Marion County and was elected to the West Virginia House of Delegates in 1948 at age 21, but was defeated for re-election in 1950.

In 1951, Manchin received his bachelor's degree in political science and sociology from West Virginia University. In 1953, he received his teaching certification from Fairmont State College. He spent most of the 1950s working as a high school teacher and wrestling coach. In 1962, he received his master's degree in education from West Virginia University.

Early career
In 1961, President John F. Kennedy appointed Manchin to serve as state director of the Farmers Home Administration and in 1970 he was appointed special assistant to the National Administrator of the Farmers Home Administration.

In 1972, he ran for West Virginia Secretary of State when incumbent Jay Rockefeller retired to run for governor. In the seven candidate Democratic primary, he lost and ranked second place with 18% of the vote, behind Thomas Winner who won with a plurality of 20% of the vote. After the election, Governor Arch A. Moore Jr. in 1973 appointed him to direct the Rehabilitation Environmental Action Program (REAP), a successful effort which rid the State of more than 100,000 junked cars as well as numerous appliances. He would visit schools and ask students for help by joining his “REAP Regiment.”

Statewide office
In 1976, Manchin ran again to become Secretary of State and defeated incumbent Republican James R. McCartney 55%-45%.

In 1980, he won re-election with 71% of the vote.

Elected State Treasurer in 1984, he created the Teddi Program, which brought 28,000 new jobs to West Virginia. He was impeached by the House of Delegates on March 30, 1989, amid a controversy over bad investments that lost the state $279 million mainly during the time period between April and June 1987. The impeachment resolution blamed Manchin for negligence in delegating and supervising the investment fund, making improper investments and covering up losses.

Though he initially vowed to stay in office, conviction by the Senate would have meant losing his eligibility to run for office again, and could have cost him his pension. He resigned before his impeachment trial before the State Senate was completed.

West Virginia legislature (1998-2003)

Elections
He later returned to the House of Delegates in 1998, where he served until his death from a massive heart attack in 2003.

Tenure
The House of Delegates called him "a flamboyant character of the first magnitude" and praised his love of ceremony in their resolution honoring him after his death.

Committee assignments
Government Organization
Roads and Transportation
Veteran Affair (Vice Chair)
Enrolled Bills (Chair)

Personal life
Manchin was married to Stella Machel Petros and had three children. One of his sons, Mark, is Harrison County, West Virginia Superintendent of Schools. A Roman Catholic, he served as a lector at his church.

References

Further reading
Icenhower, Greg (1990), A. James Manchin: A Biography of Controversy; Headline Books, 212 pgs.

External links
A. James Manchin at The Political Graveyard
Rehabilitation Environmental Action Program (REAP)

1927 births
2003 deaths
United States officials impeached by state or territorial governments
Manchin family
Democratic Party members of the West Virginia House of Delegates
People from Farmington, West Virginia
Secretaries of State of West Virginia
State treasurers of West Virginia
West Virginia University alumni
Politicians from Fairmont, West Virginia
American people of Italian descent
Catholics from West Virginia
20th-century American politicians
21st-century American politicians
Candidates in the 1972 United States elections